Crepidium fimbriatum, commonly known as the fringed spur orchid, is a plant in the orchid family and is endemic to tropical Far North Queensland. It is an evergreen, terrestrial orchid with a fleshy stem, wavy leaves and many purple flowers crowded on a purple flowering stem.

Description
The leaves are dark green, egg-shaped and pleated, with wavy margins. The petals are curved, slightly smaller than the sepals and have a pointed tip. Flowering occurs between January and March.

Taxonomy and naming
Crepidium fimbriatum was first formally described in 1981 by Bill Lavarack who gave it the name Malaxis fimbriatum and published the description in the journal Austrobaileya. In 1995 Dariusz Szlachetko changed the name to Crepidium fimbriatum. The specific epithet (fimbriatum) is a Latin word meaning "fringed" or "fibrous".

Distribution and habitat
The fringed spur orchid grows in shady places in rainforest in the McIlwraith Range and possibly elsewhere.

Conservation
This orchid is classed as "vulnerable" under the Queensland Nature Conservation Act 1992.

References

fimbriatum
Orchids of Queensland
Plants described in 1981